The Military Road-Cadron Segment is a portion of 19th-century roadway in Faulkner County, Arkansas, near the city of Conway.  It consists of an original section of a military road built in the mid-1830s between Little Rock and the military outpost at Fort Smith, through what was then frontier territory.  It is one of the only known surviving sections of the early military roads that crossed the Arkansas Territory, which is located west of Little Rock.  The road is further notable as one of the routes by which Native Americans were relocated to Indian Territory (now Oklahoma) from points east of the Mississippi River.

The road section was listed on the National Register of Historic Places in 2004.

See also
National Register of Historic Places listings in Faulkner County, Arkansas

References

Roads on the National Register of Historic Places in Arkansas
Transportation in Faulkner County, Arkansas
National Register of Historic Places in Faulkner County, Arkansas